American singer Christina Aguilera has embarked on six concert tours, four of which have been worldwide. Her debut tour, Christina Aguilera in Concert was held in North America in 2000, and later it was extended to South America and Asia in 2001. During the promotion of her fourth studio album Stripped (2002) in 2003, Aguilera toured with Justin Timberlake in North America with The Justified & Stripped Tour in 45 dates. The tour was the 16th highest-grossing tour of the year.  In late 2003, Aguilera continued to tour alone without Timberlakes' act in Europe, Japan and Australia. Aguilera was expected to return to North America in the summer of 2004, however, 29 dates were canceled due to Aguilera's vocal cord injuries. In 2006, Aguilera's fourth concert tour Back to Basics Tour was held in support of her fifth studio album Back to Basics (2006). The tour grossed over $48.2 million, with $48.1 million in 2007 alone, becoming the highest-grossing tour of the year by a female artist. In 2010, Aguilera planned to tour in the summer to promote her sixth studio album Bionic (2010), but her management team revealed that the tour was postponed due to Aguilera's promotion for her first feature film, Burlesque (2010). Aguilera reported that she would reschedule the tour in 2011, although these plans never materialized. In September 2018, Aguilera embarked on The Liberation Tour in promotion of her album Liberation, which was her first tour in a decade. In between the legs of her concert residency Christina Aguilera: The Xperience, Aguilera toured in Europe and Mexico with The X Tour. There were plans for her to headline a North American tour throughout 2020, with Adam Lambert as an opening act. These plans were ultimately cancelled due to the COVID-19 pandemic.

Concert tours

Headlining 
{| class="wikitable sortable plainrowheaders" style="text-align:center;" width="100%"
! scope="col" width="19%" |Title
! scope="col" width="15%" |Dates
! scope="col" width="15%" |Associated album(s)
! scope="col" width="13%" |Location
! scope="col" width="4%" |Shows
! scope="col" width="11%" |Gross
! scope="col" width="11%" | Gross in 
! scope="col" width="8%" |Attendance
! class="unsortable" scope="col" width="2%" |
|-

! scope="row" |Christina Aguilera in Concert
|–
|Christina AguileraMi Reflejo
|North AmericaEuropeLatin AmericaAsia
|82
|$1,829,356
|$
|35,339
|
|- class="expand-child"
| colspan="9" style = "border-bottom-width:3px; padding:5px;" |

|-

! scope="row" |
|–
|Stripped
|EuropeAsiaAustralia
|37
| colspan="3" 
|
|- class="expand-child"
| colspan="9" style = "border-bottom-width:3px; padding:5px;" |

|-

! scope="row" |Back to Basics Tour
|–
|Back to Basics
|EuropeNorth AmericaAsiaAustralia
|82
|$48,173,773
|$
|907,568
|
|- class="expand-child"
| colspan="9" style = "border-bottom-width:3px; padding:5px;" |

|-

! scope="row" |
|–
|Liberation
|North America
|21
|$8,700,000
|$
|77,854
|''
|- class="expand-child"
| colspan="9" style = "border-bottom-width:3px; padding:5px;" |
{{hidden
| headercss = font-size: 100%; width: 95%;
| contentcss = text-align: left; font-size: 100%; width: 95%;
| header = The Liberation Tour set list
| content = 

"Liberation"
"Searching for Maria" / "Maria"
"Genie in a Bottle"
"Dirrty" 
 "Sick of Sittin'"
 "Can't Hold Us Down"
"Right Moves"
"Deserve"
 "Accelerate"
 "Elastic Love" / "Woohoo" 
 "Bionic"
 "Express" / "Lady Marmalade" 
"Back In The Day"
 "Ain't No Other Man"
"Wonderland"
 "Say Something"
 "It's a Man's Man's Man's World"
 "Fighter"
"Dreamers" / "Fall in Line"
 "Twice"
 "Beautiful"
Encore
"Unless It's with You"
 "Let There Be Love" 
}}
|-

! scope="row" |
|–
|Liberation
|EuropeLatin America
|18
|$5,418,150
|$
|76,711
|
|- class="expand-child"
| colspan="9" style = "border-bottom-width:3px; padding:5px;" |

|-
|}

Co-headlining

Cancelled tours

See also 
 Christina Aguilera discography
 Christina Aguilera videography
 List of Christina Aguilera concerts
 List of songs recorded by Christina Aguilera

References

External links 
 Christina Aguilera events

Aguilera